The Rt Hon. Sir Maurice Gibson, P.C. (1 May 1913 – 25 April 1987), was a Lord Justice of Appeal in Northern Ireland. He was killed, along with his wife Cecily, Lady Gibson by the Provisional Irish Republican Army (IRA).

Life and Work

Sir Maurice was born in Montpelier House, Belfast. He was educated at the Royal Belfast Academical Institution and graduated with a law degree from Queen's University Belfast. He was called to the bar in 1937 and subsequently elected a bencher in 1961 and described by Lord MacDermott in 1968 as the best lawyer at the Bar. In 1968 he became Chancery Judge and Lord of Appeal in 1977. The couple had two children.

In 1977, he acquitted the soldier who shot Majella O'Hare, a 12-year-old girl. The UK government apologised for this killing in 2011 and said the justification Gibson accepted was "unlikely".

Death

Lord Justice Gibson and his wife were killed by a remote-controlled car bomb as they drove over the Irish border back into Northern Ireland on 25 April 1987 after a holiday in the USA.   As the judge's car reached Drumad, the townland on the County Louth side of the border, he stopped to shake hands with the Garda Síochána security escort who had completed their part of the assignment. The couple had only a short drive to meet the Royal Ulster Constabulary escort to Belfast. 

Between the two points lay the bomb, near a petrol station near Killean in County Armagh. The explosion threw the Gibsons' vehicle across the road, killing the couple immediately. The explosion also injured Ireland national rugby union team players Nigel Carr, David Irwin and Philip Rainey who were in a car on the same road.

The case was investigated by the Cory Collusion Inquiry into cases of collusion between security forces and paramilitaries after persistent questions over whether the Garda Siochana had tipped off the IRA of the Gibson's travel arrangements. Cory found insufficient evidence to warrant a public inquiry into the incident. The later Smithwick Tribunal found that Cory had been 'mistaken' in questioning the reliability of intelligence that a member of the Garda had helped the IRA in the Gibsons' murders, and in May 2014, former Northern Ireland First Minister Lord Trimble called for an inquiry into whether there was collusion.

References

 Toby Harnden. Bandit Country: The IRA and South Armagh, Hodder & Stoughton Ltd, 1999, paperback 404 pages, 

1913 births
Deaths by car bomb in Northern Ireland
People killed by the Provisional Irish Republican Army
Alumni of Queen's University Belfast
Members of the Privy Council of the United Kingdom
British terrorism victims
Terrorism deaths in Northern Ireland
Knights Bachelor
Lords Justice of Appeal of Northern Ireland
High Court judges of Northern Ireland
People murdered in Northern Ireland
Northern Ireland King's Counsel
1987 murders in the United Kingdom
1987 deaths
1980s murders in Northern Ireland